The 1952–53 season was Blackpool F.C.'s 45th season (42nd consecutive) in the Football League. They competed in the 22-team Division One, then the top tier of English football, finishing seventh.

They were also the winners of the FA Cup, the only time they have done so to date, beating Bolton Wanderers 4–3 in the final. Although it subsequently became known as "The Matthews Final", Stan Mortensen, Blackpool's top scorer in all competitions that season, scored a hat-trick in the match. It remained the only such feat achieved in an FA Cup Final held at the original Wembley Stadium.

Stan Mortensen was the club's top scorer for the ninth consecutive season, with eighteen goals in all competitions. He shared the accolade in the league with Allan Brown. The two scored fifteen goals apiece.

First-team squad

Competitions

Overall record

Football League First Division

League table

Results

In summary

By matchday

In detail

FA Cup

Squad statistics

Appearances and goals

Goalscorers

Clean sheets

Transfers

Transfers in

Transfers out

References

General
Books

Websites

Specific

Blackpool F.C.
Blackpool F.C. seasons